The 2014–15 Hong Kong First Division League is 1st season of Hong Kong First Division League since it became the second-tier football league in Hong Kong in 2014–15.

The league started on 7 September 2014 and ended on 12 June 2015.

Teams

 Citizen
 Double Flower
 HKFC
 Happy Valley
 Kwai Tsing
 Kwun Tong
 Lucky Mile
 Shatin
 Southern
 Sun Hei
 Sun Source
 Tai Chung
 Tuen Mun
 Wanchai SF
 Yau Tsim Mong

League table

Results

References

Hong Kong First Division League seasons
Hong